In a cave system, the epiphreatic zone or floodwater zone is the zone between the vadose (unsaturated) zone above and phreatic (saturated) zone below.  It is regularly flooded and has a significant porosity. It has a great potential for cave formation.

See also

References

Aquifers
Cave geology
Hydrogeology
Soil physics